This is a list of radio stations in the Mexican state of Yucatán, which can be sorted by their call signs, frequencies, location, ownership, names, and programming formats.

Defunct stations 
 XHPKAS-FM 93.3 Tunkás
 XHIPM-FM 102.3 Mérida

Notes

References 

Yucatán
Yucatán